Polly Bukta (born April 3, 1937) is the Iowa State Representative from the 26th District and is the Speaker Pro Tempore. She has served in the Iowa House of Representatives since 1997.  She received her BS from Mercyhurst University.

Bukta currently serves on several committees in the Iowa House - the Education committee; the Local Government committee; the Transportation committee; and the Veterans Affairs committee.  Her political experience includes serving as vice-chair of the Clinton County Democrats.

Bukta was re-elected in 2006 with 5,536 votes (60%), defeating Republican opponent Lester A. Shields.

External links
 Representative Polly Bukta official Iowa General Assembly site
Polly Bukta State Representative official constituency site
 

Democratic Party members of the Iowa House of Representatives
Living people
Women state legislators in Iowa
1937 births
Mercyhurst University alumni
Politicians from Clinton, Iowa
People from Greenville, Pennsylvania
21st-century American women